The Tennyson Power Station was a coal-fired power station in Tennyson, Brisbane, Queensland, Australia, which operated between 1953 and 1986.  The power station was the second major plant constructed for Brisbane, the first being the New Farm Powerhouse.  It had an installed capacity of 250 MW.

Planning for a new power station started in 1946 as plants at New Farm and Bulimba had reached capacity. Before the Tennyson Power Station was completed demand for power was exceeding capacity.  This led to the successful staggering of work hours and some restrictions on electricity use.

The land on which the power station was built was acquired by Brisbane City Council in 1947 as an ideal site to generate power for the city, due to its proximity to the Brisbane central business district and both rail and river access from Ipswich. Construction of the power station began in 1949.

The power plant was fueled by subbituminous coal, transported via the Brisbane River on barges from Ipswich.

After the power station was shut down, demolition was avoided for many years, partially due to the hazardous nature of the asbestos used in construction. The opening scene of the 2002 film Scooby-Doo was filmed here. In 2005, a contract was awarded to the developer Mirvac by the Government of Queensland to develop the site. The power station was demolished and both the Queensland Tennis Centre and Tennyson Reach apartment complex were built in its place.

See also

List of power stations in Queensland

References

External links

Coal-fired power stations in Queensland
1953 establishments in Australia
1986 disestablishments in Australia
Buildings and structures in Brisbane
Energy infrastructure completed in 1953